Michaela Marion Noll ( Tadjadod; born 24 December 1959) is a German lawyer and politician of the Christian Democratic Union (CDU) who served as a member of the Bundestag from the state of North Rhine-Westphalia from 2002 until 2021.

Early life
Michaela Marion Tadjadod was born as the daughter of a German mother and Iranian banker Mostafa Tadjadod, who founded Bazargani Bank and served in the government of Mohammad Reza Pahlavi as his economy minister; later he fled Iran. She grew up with her grandparents in a soldiers' household in the Rhineland.

Early career
After graduating from Mataré-Gymnasium, Meerbusch in 1980, Tadjadod spent a year in the United States for language immersion then she trained as an interpreter for English, French and Spanish from 1981 to 1982, when she began studying law at the University of Cologne and at Johann Wolfgang Goethe University in Frankfurt. In 1987 she passed her first state bar examination and in December 1991 her second. After two years on parental leave, from 1994 to 2002 she was a consultant for the women's union of the CDU-NRW in Düsseldorf and in 2001 she was admitted to the bar.

Political career 
Noll first became a member of the Bundestag after the 2002 German federal election. She was a member of the Committee for Family, Senior Citizens, Women and Youth from 2002 until 2013 and again from 2018 until 2021. From 2014 until 2017, she served on the Defence Committee.

In addition to her committee assignments, Noll was part of the German-French Parliamentary Friendship Group, the German-Swiss Parliamentary Friendship Group and the German Parliamentary Friendship Group with Australia and New Zealand. She was also a member of the German delegation to the Parliamentary Assembly of the Organization for Security and Co-operation in Europe (OSCE).

In late 2019, Noll announced that she would not stand in the 2021 federal elections but instead resign from active politics by the end of the parliamentary term.

Other activities
 German Foundation for Peace Research (DSF), Member of the Board (since 2018)

Political positions
In June 2017, Noll voted against Germany's introduction of same-sex marriage.

Personal life
As Michaela Tadjadod, she gave birth to a son in 1991 from her prior marriage to an attorney. She married again in 2002 and took the surname Noll shortly after her election to the Bundestag. Noll is Roman Catholic.

References

External links 

  
 Bundestag biography 

1959 births
Living people
Members of the Bundestag for North Rhine-Westphalia
Female members of the Bundestag
21st-century German women politicians
Members of the Bundestag 2017–2021
Members of the Bundestag 2013–2017
Members of the Bundestag 2009–2013
Members of the Bundestag 2005–2009
Members of the Bundestag 2002–2005
Members of the Bundestag for the Christian Democratic Union of Germany
German politicians of Iranian descent
German Roman Catholics
German women lawyers
20th-century German lawyers
Goethe University Frankfurt alumni
Politicians from Düsseldorf
University of Cologne alumni